Mohammad Mohammadi Barimanlou (born 24 January 1994) is an Iranian judoka.

He participated at the 2018 World Judo Championships, winning a bronze medal.  He won a bronze medal at the 2018 Asian Games in Jakarta.

References

External links
 

1991 births
Living people
Iranian male judoka
Judoka at the 2018 Asian Games
Asian Games bronze medalists for Iran
Asian Games medalists in judo
Medalists at the 2018 Asian Games
People from Bojnord
21st-century Iranian people